Garrard Mills is a gristmill in Lancaster, Kentucky. The property was listed on the National Register of Historic Places in 1984.

It is a flour and feed mill which was built in 1901.

References

National Register of Historic Places in Garrard County, Kentucky
Agricultural buildings and structures on the National Register of Historic Places in Kentucky
Grinding mills in Kentucky
Grinding mills on the National Register of Historic Places
Lancaster, Kentucky
1901 establishments in Kentucky
Industrial buildings completed in 1901
Industrial buildings and structures on the National Register of Historic Places in Kentucky